Cynthia Addai-Robinson (born January 12, 1985) is an American actress. She is known for her roles as Naevia in the Starz television series Spartacus, DC Comics character Amanda Waller in The CW TV series Arrow, and Nadine Memphis on the USA Network series Shooter. She currently plays the role of Tar-Míriel on the Amazon Prime The Lord of the Rings series The Rings of Power.

Early life
Addai-Robinson was born in London; her mother is from Ghana and her father is a U.S. citizen. She moved to the U.S. when she was 4 and was raised by her mother in a suburb of Washington, D.C. She graduated from Montgomery Blair High School in Silver Spring, Maryland and Tisch School of the Arts with a Bachelor of Fine Arts in Theater. In addition, she trained at Lee Strasberg Theater Institute and in dance forms ballet, jazz and tap.

Career 
After participating in several various Off-Broadway plays, Addai-Robinson got her first role on television in 2002 in an episode of The Education of Max Bickford. In following years, she made small appearances on television shows like Law & Order: Trial by Jury, Law & Order: Criminal Intent, CSI: Miami, Numb3rs and Justice. In 2006, she was originally cast to play Melanie Barnett in the American sitcom The Game, but was replaced by Tia Mowry for unspecified reasons prior to the show's production. In 2009, she got her first recurring role on the ABC drama FlashForward as the character Debbie, a nurse. The same year she appeared in Tina Mabry's independent film Mississippi Damned as Milena.

In 2011, Addai-Robinson made her big screen debut as the mother of Zoe Saldana's character (played by Amandla Stenberg) in Colombiana.

Her biggest role came from 2012 to 2013 when she was cast as Naevia in the third season Spartacus: Vengeance and the fourth season Spartacus: War of the Damned after Lesley-Ann Brandt decided to leave the series.

In early 2013, Addai-Robinson played Aja, a powerful witch who came to help Bonnie on The Vampire Diaries for two episodes. She made a brief appearance as an on looker in the crowd in the film Star Trek Into Darkness. She played Leslie in Jodi Arias: Dirty Little Secret, a television movie about the murder of Travis Alexander. In September 2013, she was cast as the recurring character Amanda Waller in the hit The CW show Arrow.

In March 2014, she was cast as Emily D. West in the History Channel 2015 miniseries Texas Rising. Her performance was nominated for a Women's Image Network Award for Best Actress in a Drama Series.

In January 2015, Addai-Robinson was cast in Gavin O'Connor's The Accountant, alongside Ben Affleck and J. K. Simmons, playing a U.S. Treasury Department analyst. The film was released in October 2016.

In March 2016, it was announced that she would be taking over Emily Rios's role from the television series Shooter as the female lead.

Filmography

Film

Television

Video games

Awards and nominations

References

External links

 
 

1985 births
Living people
Actresses from London
Actresses from Washington, D.C.
African-American actresses
American people of Ghanaian descent
American television actresses
Black British actresses
English people of American descent
English people of Ghanaian descent
English television actresses
Lee Strasberg Theatre and Film Institute alumni
Tisch School of the Arts alumni
British emigrants to the United States